Roorkee Institute of Technology, Roorkee (also known as RIT Roorkee) is an Engineering college located in Roorkee, Uttarakhand, India. It is affiliated with Uttarakhand Technical University, Dehradun and approved by AICTE. It was established under the tutelage of Himalayan Charitable Trust (HCT) in the year 2005.

Location 
Roorkee Institute of Technology is located 7 km from Roorkee city on NH-344. RIT is spread over a 22-acre campus.

Courses offered 

B.Tech(CSE, ME, EE, ECE, CE)
B.Sc.(Agriculture, Forestry)
Diploma in Engineering(EE, CE, ME)
B.Ed
MBA
MCA
M.Tech(EE, ME, CE)

Departments
RIT, Roorkee has 12 academic departments covering engineering, management and other programs:

 Civil Engineering
 Computer Engineering
 Electronics and Communication Engineering
 Electrical Engineering
 Mechanical Engineering
 Management Studies
 Masters of Computer Application
 Applied Science and Humanities
 Agriculture/ Forestry
Education

B.Tech Collaborative programme in Computer Science
 Apple iOS certification including objective C & Swift Certification
 Web Based Technology Certification
 Data Analytics Certification
 Web Designing and Development Certification
 Android Application Development Certification
 Software Development Certification
 Internet of Things (IOT) Certification
 Microsoft Edu-Cloud Certification
 Cyber Security Certification

Library
The Library contains journals and books in related fields of engineering, Science, Technology and Management.

Student housing (hostels)
The campus has 2 hostels, one each for boys and girls. Each hostel has its own mess. Most students live in the hostels, where extracurricular activities complement the academic routine. For sports activity college campus has a large playground. Entire Campus is Wifi Enabled.

Student activities
SWAR is the local student body which looks after the extra curricular activities being organized on the campus. It conducts both technical and cultural activities on campus.(Anugoonj).

References

External links
 India Today article listing RIT as fifth most promising college

Engineering colleges in Uttarakhand
Universities and colleges in Uttarakhand
Education in Roorkee
Educational institutions established in 2005
2005 establishments in Uttarakhand